Mukesh Choudhary (born 6 July 1996) is an Indian cricketer. He made his first-class debut for Maharashtra in the 2017–18 Ranji Trophy on 9 November 2017. He made his List A debut on 7 October 2019, for Maharashtra in the 2019–20 Vijay Hazare Trophy. He made his Twenty20 debut on 8 November 2019, for Maharashtra in the 2019–20 Syed Mushtaq Ali Trophy. In February 2022, he was bought by the Chennai Super Kings in the auction for the 2022 Indian Premier League tournament.

References

External links
 

1996 births
Living people
Indian cricketers
Cricketers from Rajasthan
Maharashtra cricketers
Chennai Super Kings cricketers